Gadfly most commonly refers to:
 Horse-fly or Botfly
 Gadfly (philosophy and social science), a person who upsets the status quo

Gadfly may also refer to:

Entertainment
 The Gadfly, an 1897 novel by Ethel Lilian Voynich
 The Gadfly (play), an 1898 play by George Bernard Shaw
 The Gadfly (1928 film), a Soviet film by Kote Marjanishvili
 The Gadfly (1955 film), a Soviet film by Aleksandr Fajntsimmer
 The Gadfly Suite, a musical suite by Dmitri Shostakovich for the 1955 film
 The Gadfly (1980 film), a Soviet film by Nikolai Mashchenko
 The Gadfly (opera), a 1958 Russian opera by Antonio Spadavecchia
 Gadfly Online, an online and print magazine
 The Gadfly (Adelaide), a 1906–1909 Australian literary magazine produced by C. J. Dennis
 The Gadfly (album), a 2003 album by LPG
 The Gadfly, a fictional play in the novels of Geoffrey Trease, see The Hills of Varna

Other uses
 Gadfly (database), a relational database management system
 Gadfly (mythology), the insect as sent by Hera to torment Io in Greek mythology
 Gadfly, the NATO reporting name for a Russian 9K37 Buk surface-to-air missile system
 Education Gadfly, the weekly e-bulletin of the Thomas B. Fordham Institute
 Autism's Gadfly, a blog maintained by Jonathan Mitchell (writer)
 A package for plotting and data visualisation written in Julia.

See also
 HMS Gadfly, a list of ships of the Royal Navy